Joe Harry Lycett (born 5 July 1988), also known by the self-given moniker Mummy, is an English comedian, painter and television presenter. Known for his sardonically camp style, whimsical public stunts and elaborate set designs, Lycett has been described as one of Britain's most popular comedians.

Lycett began performing stand-up in 2009 and won the Chortle Student Comedian of the Year the same year. He has appeared on TV shows including Live at the Apollo, Taskmaster, Never Mind the Buzzcocks, 8 Out of 10 Cats, QI, as the announcer on Saturday BBC One show Epic Win, the narrator for Ibiza Weekender and as the presenter on BBC Two's The Great British Sewing Bee and Channel 4's consumer rights show, Joe Lycett's Got Your Back. In February 2020, Lycett briefly changed his name by deed poll to Hugo Boss as part of a protest against the fashion brand of the same name. He is also recognised as one of Britain's most high-profile queer or pansexual men, and has partaken in advocacy for the LGBT community on many occasions.

Early life
Lycett was born to parents David and Helen Lycett in Hall Green, Birmingham. He grew up in Solihull.

He attended King Edward VI Five Ways grammar school, and then studied drama and English at the University of Manchester.

Career

In his early career as a 22-year-old comedian, Lycett appeared on stage alongside Jim Davidson. Davidson is known for his offensive jokes, which have been described as both racist and homophobic, and Lycett complained about Davidson's use of the racial slur 'chink' in one of his jokes (which Davidson later removed). The two became friends while touring together (with Davidson's only complaint to Lycett being that he swore too much). "[Jim Davidson's] views on race are incredibly misguided but he is very educated about it. He has read the Quran, and at one point told me in detail about the origins of Rastafarianism", Lycett told the Birmingham Mail in 2011.

Lycett has appeared on television on Live At The Apollo, 8 Out of 10 Cats, 8 Out of 10 Cats Does Countdown, Celebrity Juice, Never Mind the Buzzcocks, Spicks and Specks, Would I Lie to You?, Insert Name Here Virtually Famous, and Two Pints of Lager and a Packet of Crisps, and was a regular panelist on the E4 show Dirty Digest. He has co-written narration on ITV2 shows The Magaluf Weekender and Ibiza Weekender. Lycett featured on Alan Davies: As Yet Untitled Christmas Special with Jason Manford, Rev Richard Coles, and Jo Joyner. Lycett starred as one of the contestants in the fourth series of Taskmaster, and has made several guest appearances on Sunday Brunch in the absence of one of the regular hosts.

On the radio he has been a guest on Scott Mills, Greg James and Nick Grimshaw's programmes on BBC Radio 1 and on Richard Bacon's programme on BBC Radio 5 Live. In August 2011, he wrote and performed the short story "Spooky and the Van" which was broadcast in the Afternoon Reading slot on BBC Radio 4. In August 2013, he made his debut on Just a Minute on BBC Radio 4. In September 2016, he took over from Miles Jupp as the host of It's Not What You Know, also on BBC Radio 4. Lycett was known as "the resident news hound" on Josh Widdicombe's XFM radio show, which was broadcast on Saturday (and later Sunday) mornings.

In addition to his appearances on various radio stations, Lycett has featured as a guest on numerous podcasts, including My Dad Wrote a Porno, SoundCheck Podcast, The Comedian's Comedian with Stuart Goldsmith, and the Richard Herring Leicester Square Theatre Podcast.

Lycett is also a self-trained painter and has had exhibitions of his work. In 2018, a sculpture of his, CHRIS, was accepted by Royal Academy and listed for sale as being worth £12,500,000. CHRIS is still for sale on Lycett's website for the same amount.

On 12 February 2019, Joe Lycett took over as the new presenter on the fifth series of BBC Two's The Great British Sewing Bee.

Lycett started presenting his consumer show Joe Lycett's Got Your Back, which was branded a "sexy Watchdog" in 2019 with help from various guests and Mark Silcox. The show takes on big corporations, such as airlines and banks, to provide justice for consumers, with a comedic spin. The series was renewed for a second series. Lycett describes the show as "a cross between Rogue Traders and RuPaul's Drag Race".

On 17 August 2019 and 26 October 2019, Lycett stood in for Rylan Clark-Neal on Rylan on Saturday on BBC Radio 2. In December 2019 he returned to Radio 2 covering Sara Cox's drive-time show during the Christmas and New Year period.

In February 2020, in response to a legal dispute between fashion company Hugo Boss and the Swansea-based Boss Brewing, Lycett changed his name by deed poll from Joe Lycett to Hugo Boss. He said that he was drawing attention to the company's use of legal action and cease and desist letters relating to alleged copyright violations against numerous small businesses, including Boss Brewing, for use of the word 'Boss'. In the second series of Joe Lycett's Got Your Back, the comedian launched a fake fashion show celebrating the release of a wrist brace under the name 'Hugo Boss' outside the flagship store of the fashion company with the same name in Regent Street, London. Lycett claims that Hugo Boss, the company, called the police following this incident. In April 2020, he changed his name back to Joe Lycett.

In 2021, Lycett presented the television documentary Joe Lycett vs the Oil Giant.

In June 2022, a member of the audience at a Belfast show called the Police Service of Northern Ireland to complain about a joke that referenced a donkey. Lycett bemoaned being investigated by the police over a joke, but was happy to recount his enjoyment from repeating the joke, which he regarded as one of his best, in his messages to the police. The investigation was subsequently closed.

On 4 September 2022, Lycett appeared as a panellist on the debut issue of Sunday with Laura Kuenssberg. The show featured an interview with Liz Truss, who at the time was considered highly likely to win, and eventually did win, the July–September 2022 Conservative Party leadership election and therefore become Prime Minister. The cost-of-living crisis, caused in part by high energy bills, was a current significant issue. Truss had given few interviews since the start of the election selecting the leader of the Conservative party. On the show, Truss gave assurances. When asked for comment by Kuenssberg, Lycett said with deadpan delivery that he was "very right-wing" and that he loved the clarity, and was reassured by Truss's statements about the proposed measures to address the crisis. He used apophasis and suggested that he would not say that from dregs, Truss was the "backwash of available MPs".  This was met with incredulity from Kuenssberg and titters from other guests. In a similar vein, Lycett went on to state Truss was right to ignore economists' stark predictions. Several days later, MP Steve Brine asked BBC Director-General Tim Davie about "the Joe Lycett debacle" when Davie appeared before the Digital, Culture, Media and Sport Committee.

On 13 November 2022, Lycett released a video criticizing David Beckham for his multimillion pound sponsorship deal promoting the 2022 FIFA World Cup in Qatar due to the country's stance on LGBT rights. In the video, he said he would give £10,000 to charities that support queer people in football if Beckham pulled out of the deal. If Beckham did not pull out of the deal, he promised to shred the money during a livestream on 20 November, just before the World Cup opening ceremony. On 20 November, Beckham had not pulled out of the deal, so Lycett livestreamed himself appearing to shred the money on the website benderslikebeckham.com. The next day, he revealed that he had faked the shredding and had already donated £10,000 to LGBTQ+ charities.

In December 2022, against the backdrop of his criticising David Beckham's sponsorshop deal, the tabloid newspaper The Sun published an article detailing the fact that Lycett had previously performed in Doha, Qatar, in 2015. The paper suggested that Lycett had engaged in "hypocrisy" by himself performing in Qatar. Lycett responded on Twitter, highlighting that him performing in Doha in 2015 was not secret and that he does not "have the perfect hindsight and spotless morality of, to pick a completely random example, The Sun newspaper."

Awards
In 2009, Lycett was awarded that year's Chortle Student Comedian of the Year award and was also the winner of Bath New Act competition. He was runner-up in the 2009 Laughing Horse New Act of the Year, and a finalist in the 2011 BBC New Comedy Awards. In 2012, his debut stand-up show Some Lycett Hot was nominated for Best Newcomer at the Edinburgh Comedy Awards.

Personal life
Lycett frequently refers to his bisexuality and pansexuality as part of his stand-up routines. In 2021, Lycett was described by Unicorn magazine as "probably the most high-profile pansexual man in Britain today". In a 2015 interview with Attitude magazine, he described how being bisexual "presents its own challenges," when people have "no box to put you in", adding "It just means you fancy people of all genders."

In 2015, while performing in York, Lycett was given a parking ticket for parking illegally in a taxi rank. The ensuing trail of correspondence, between him and City of York Council, was recounted as an anecdote on 8 Out of 10 Cats Does Countdown and then became the basis for one of his stand-up routines.

In May 2019, Lycett arranged for the Birmingham Lord Mayor Yvonne Mosquito to officially open his kitchen extension. At first, Mosquito declined, as it was not a public event, but after Lycett raffled four tickets to the event to the public she agreed.

Lycett has been a supporter of West Bromwich Albion since 2012. He suffers from anxiety and panic attacks.

Lycett lives in Birmingham and has a flat in Peckham.

Filmography

Television

Stand-up DVDs

References

External links
 
 

1988 births
Comedians from Birmingham, West Midlands
English male comedians
English television presenters
English LGBT rights activists
English LGBT comedians
Bisexual comedians
Bisexual men
Pansexual men
Bisexual rights activists
Living people
Alumni of the University of Manchester